Francis Gomes (born 29 November 1948) is a former Indian cricket umpire. He stood in two ODI games between 2000 and 2001.

See also
 List of One Day International cricket umpires

References

1948 births
Living people
Indian One Day International cricket umpires
Place of birth missing (living people)